Bonegilla was a railway station located in the town of Bonegilla, on the Cudgewa railway line in Victoria, Australia. The platform has been restored as part of the Rail Trail.

Disused railway stations in Victoria (Australia)